A general election was held in the U.S. state of Wyoming on Tuesday, November 8, 1966. All of the state's executive officers—the Governor, Secretary of State, Auditor, Treasurer, and Superintendent of Public Instruction—were up for election. After winning all of the statewide executive offices in 1962, Republicans did even better in 1966, improving their margins of victory in each race and holding all the offices.

Governor

Incumbent Republican Governor Clifford Hansen opted to run for the U.S. Senate rather than seek re-election. Former Goshen County Prosecuting Attorney Stanley Hathaway emerged as the Republican nominee, while attorney Ernest Wilkerson won a crowded and close Democratic primary. Hathaway largely duplicated Hansen's performance from four years prior, winning by a slightly smaller margin.

Secretary of State
Incumbent Republican Secretary of State Thyra Thomson ran for re-election to a second term. No Democratic candidates initially filed to run against her, but a successful write-in campaign by L. W. "Jack" Jones, a member of the University of Wyoming Board of Trustees, allowed him to claim the Democratic nomination. However, Thomson retained a considerable amount of popularity and easily defeated Jones to win a second term.

Democratic primary

Candidates
No Democratic candidates filed to oppose Thomson prior to the end of qualifying. However, the Wyoming Democratic Party selected L. W. "Jack" Jones, a member of the University of Wyoming Board of Trustees, to run a write-in campaign in the hopes of winning the nomination by that method. Jones won 3,879 votes as a write-in candidate in the primary, thereby enabling him to receive the Democratic Party's nomination, which he accepted.

Republican primary

Candidates
 Thyra Thomson, incumbent Secretary of State

Results

General election

Results

Auditor
Incumbent Republican State Auditor Minnie A. Mitchell opted to run for State Treasurer instead of for a fourth term as State Auditor, thereby allowing term-limited State Treasurer Everett T. Copenhaver to run for State Auditor. Copenhaver faced minimal challengers in his bid for Auditor, winning the Republican primary unopposed and only facing rancher Bob Bentley, the Democratic nominee, in the general election. Copenhaver ultimately defeated Bentley in a landslide.

Democratic primary

Candidates
 Bob Bentley, Lander rancher

Results

Republican primary

Candidates
 Everett T. Copenhaver, Wyoming State Treasurer

Results

General election

Results

Treasurer
Incumbent Republican State Treasurer Everett T. Copenhaver was unable to seek re-election due to term limits, but wanted to run for another state office. The decision by Secretary of State Thyra Thomson to not run for Governor prevented him from running for Secretary of State, and so State Auditor Minnie A. Mitchell opted to not seek another term as Auditor so that Copenhaver could succeed her. Mitchell, in turn, filed to run for State Treasurer. She was opposed in the Republican primary by State Representative Jack Van Mark, whom she easily defeated. And in the general election, she faced Democrat Bob Adams, a former State Representative who had repeatedly run for Auditor or Treasurer for the preceding 12 years. She decisively defeated Adams and returned to the office of State Treasurer, to which she had first been appointed in 1952.

Democratic primary

Candidates
 Bob Adams, former State Representative from Laramie County, 1962 Democratic nominee for Treasurer, 1958 Democratic nominee for State Auditor, 1954 Democratic nominee for State Auditor

Results

Republican primary

Candidates
 Minnie A. Mitchell, Wyoming State Auditor, former State Treasurer
 Jack Van Mark, State Representative from Goshen County

Results

General election

Results

Superintendent of Public Instruction
Incumbent Republican Superintendent of Public Instruction Cecil Shaw ran for re-election to a second term, despite some speculation that he might run for Governor. Shaw was challenged in the Republican primary by Harry Roberts, a member of the state board of education, and teacher Nancy J. Rymill. During the campaign, Shaw was attacked for allegedly using state funds in assistance of his campaign, a scandal that was compounded by his poor relationship with the Republican political establishment in the state. Ultimately, Roberts defeated Shaw in the Republican primary by a decisive margin, advancing to the general election, where he faced Katherine H. Vehar, the Democratic nominee and a former Deputy State Superintendent under Superintendent Velma Linford. Roberts narrowly defeated Vehar, winning election as Superintendent.

Democratic primary

Candidates
 Katherine H. Vehar, former Deputy State Superintendent
 William G. "Bill" Rector, State Senator from Laramie County
 Robert L. Beaver, former Northwest College professor

Results

Republican primary

Candidates
 Harry Roberts, member of the Wyoming Board of Education
 Cecil M. Shaw, incumbent State Superintendent of Public Instruction
 Nancy Jones Rymill, junior high school math teacher

Results

General election

Results

References

 
Wyoming